Helen Farish (born 1962 Cumbria) is a British poet.

Life
She received her B.A. from University of Durham, M.A. and Ph.D. from Oxford Brookes University.

She lectured in creative writing at Sheffield Hallam University.

She has been a Fellow at Hawthornden International Centre for Writers and was the first female Poet in Residence at the Wordsworth Trust (2004-5). She has also been a visiting lecturer at Sewanee University, and a visiting scholar at the University of New Hampshire.

Beginning 2007, she lectures full-time at Lancaster University, in the department of English and Creative Writing. 
 
She now lives in Cumbria.

Awards
 Intimates 2005 Forward best first collection, shortlist for the 2005 TS Eliot prize.

Works

Thesis
 Sex, God and Grief in the Poetry of Sharon Olds and Louise Glück

References

External links
 "Helen Farish's workshop", The Guardian,  21 December 2005 
 "Helen Farish", The Poetry Archive
 "Helen Farish and Feminine Poetic Identity", Adrien Grafe, E-rea, 6.1.2008, Université de Paris
 "forty-five: Helen Farish", 30 November 2008, fifty-two poets

English women poets
Academics of Sheffield Hallam University
Alumni of Van Mildert College, Durham
Alumni of Oxford Brookes University
Sewanee: The University of the South faculty
Academics of Lancaster University
University of New Hampshire faculty
1962 births
Living people